Emma Roberts is an American actress.

Emma Roberts may also refer to:
Emma Roberts (author) (1794–1840), English author
Emma Roberts (artist) (1859–1948), American artist
Lady Gerald Fitzalan-Howard, English aristocrat, born Emma Georgina Egerton Roberts